Schlechterina is a monotypic genus of flowering plants belonging to the family Passifloraceae. The only knowns species is Schlechterina mitostemmatoides.

It is native to Kenya, Mozambique, Tanzania and KwaZulu-Natal (in South Africa).

The genus name of Schlechterina is in honour of Rudolf Schlechter (1872–1925), a German taxonomist, botanist, and author of several works on orchids. The Latin specific epithet of mitostemmatoides is a compound word, 'mito-' from Greek	μίτος (mítos) meaning thread and stem. It was first described and published in Bot. Jahrb. Syst. Vol.33 on page 148 in 1902.

References

Other sources
 Fernandes, R. & Fernandes, A., 1978. Passifloraceae. In: Launert, E. (Editor). Flora Zambesiaca. Volume 4. Flora Zambesiaca Managing Committee, London, United Kingdom. pp. 368–411.
 Jäger, A.K., McAlister, B.G. & van Staden, J., 1995. Cyanogenic glycosides in leaves and callus cultures of Schlechterina mitostemmatoides. South African Journal of Botany 61(5): 274–275.
 Maite, A.L., 1994. An ethnobotanical study of two Passifloraceae species used in traditional medicine in Mozambique. In: Seyani, J.H. & Chikuni, A.C. (Editors). Proceedings of the 8th plenary meeting of AETFAT, 2–11 April 1991, Zomba, Malawi. Volume 1. pp. 267–271.

Passifloraceae
Monotypic Malpighiales genera
Plants described in 1845
Flora of Kenya
Flora of Mozambique
Flora of Tanzania
[[Category:Flora of KwaZulu-Natal